Susan Smith Richardson is an American journalist, news editor and media executive. She is managing editor at The Guardian US. Prior to that, she was the chief executive officer of the Center for Public Integrity in Washington, D.C. Until 2019, she was editorial director of newsrooms for the Solutions Journalism Network and was previously the editor and publisher of The Chicago Reporter. In 2002, she was awarded a Nieman Fellowship at Harvard University. From 2011 to 2013, she was editor of the Texas Observer magazine and from 2004 to 2007, she was an editor for the Chicago Tribune. She has served on the board of directors for the MOLLY National Journalism Prize, named after journalist Molly Ivins.

She was a research fellow at the Bernard and Audre Rapoport Center for Human Rights and Justice at the University of Texas School of Law, and directed the Frances T. "Sissy" Farenthold Archives Project.

She holds an M.P.A. from Harvard University's Kennedy School of Government and a bachelors of science in radio, television and film from the University of Texas at Austin.

References

External links 
 
 The Chicago Reporter archive of works
 Interview with WTTW. October 29, 2013.
 Interview with Columbia Journalism Review, The Kicker. April 4, 2019.

African-American women journalists
African-American journalists
Moody College of Communication alumni
Nieman Fellows
Harvard Kennedy School alumni
Living people
Year of birth missing (living people)
21st-century African-American people
21st-century African-American women